Education in Siberia expanded greatly after the Trans-Siberian Railway was completed in the 19th century. While Siberia became part of Russia in the 17th century it was not until the 20th century under the Soviet Union that education was transformed which in turn brought Siberia to economic importance. This was aimed at uniting people under the Soviet. For example, the Irkutsk State Linguistic University served as "a conduit between Russia and these native people by teaching languages" during the communist era. Imperial Russia began uniting Siberia to Russia by founding Siberia's first university, Tomsk State University, in 1878.

As teaching language helped to connect Siberia with Russia, currently there is a high demand for English to connect Siberia to the outside world. The Siberian Intercultural Bridge helps place English teachers throughout Siberia to bridge the gap between the Western world and the remote areas of Siberia. Meanwhile, the Russian government has also been encouraging English teachers to educate the population.

Currently, higher education in Siberia has sought to revive the regional culture. Kemerovo State University has specialized in Shor language to increase usage and document the language's history in Siberia.

Universities and colleges

 Altai State Agrarian University (Barnaul, 1943)
 Altai State Institute of Culture (Barnaul, 1974)
 Altai State Humanities Pedagogical University (Biysk, 1939)
 Altai State Medical University (Barnaul, 1954)
 Altai State Pedagogical University (Barnaul, 1933)
 Altai State Technical University (Barnaul, 1942)
 Altai State University (Barnaul, 1973)
 Amur State Medical Academy (Blagoveshchensk, 1952)
 Amur State University (Blagoveshchensk, 1975)
 Amur State University for the Humanities and Education (Komsomolsk-on-Amur, 1954)
 Arctic State Agrotechnological University (Yakutsk, 1985)
 Arctic State Institute of Culture and Arts (Yakutsk, 2000)
 Baikal State University (Irkutsk, 1930)
 Blagoveshchensk State Pedagogical University (1930)
 Bratsk State University
 Buryat State Agricultural Academy (Ulan-Ude, 1931)
 Buryat State University (Ulan-Ude, 1932)
 Chita State Academy of Medicine (1953)
 East Siberia State University of Technology and Management (Ulan-Ude, 1955)
 East Siberian Institute of the Ministry of Internal Affairs of Russia (Irkutsk, 1962)
 East Siberian State Institute of Culture (Ulan-Ude, 1960)
 Far Eastern Federal University (Vladivostok, 1899)
 Far Eastern Higher Combined Arms Command School (Blagoveshchensk, 1940)
 Far Eastern State Academy of Physical Culture (Khabarovsk, 1967)
 Far Eastern State Agrarian University (Blagoveshchensk, 1949)
 Far Eastern State Institute of Arts (Vladivostok, 1962)
 Far Eastern State Medical University (Khabarovsk, 1929)
 Far Eastern State Technical Fisheries University (Vladivostok, 1930)
 Far Eastern State Technical University (1930)
 Far Eastern State University (1899)
 Far Eastern State University of Railway Engineering (Khabarovsk, 1937)
 Gorno-Altaisk State University (1949)
 Higher School of Music of the Republic of Sakha (Yakutsk, 1992)
 Irkutsk Institute of Railway Engineering (1975)
 Irkutsk National Research Technical University (1930)
 Irkutsk State Academy of Economics
 Irkutsk State Agrarian University (1934)
 Irkutsk State Medical University (1919)
 Irkutsk State University (1918)
 Irkutsk State Linguistic University (1948)
 Kamchatka State Technical University (1942)
 Kamchatka State University (1958)
 Kemerovo Agricultural Institute 
 Kemerovo State Institute of Culture (1969)
 Kemerovo State Medical University (1955)
 Kemerovo State University (1973)
 Kemerovo Institute of Food Science and Technology
 Khabarovsk State Institute of Arts and Culture (1968)
 Khabarovsk State University of Economics and Law (1970)
 Khakass State University (Abakan, 1939)
 Komsomolsk-on-Amur State University (1955)
 Krasnoyarsk State Agrarian University (1953)
 Krasnoyarsk State University (Russian abbreviation is KGU) (1963) (Started as a division of Novosibirsk State University, became standalone university in 1969)
 Krasnoyarsk State Medical University (Russian abbreviation is KrasGMU) (1942)
 Krasnoyarsk State Pedagogical University (Russian abbreviation is KGPU) (1932)
 Kuzbass Institute of the Federal Penitentiary Service of Russia (Novokuznetsk, 1999)
 Kuzbass State Agricultural Academy (Kemerovo, 2002)
 Kuzbass State Technical University (Kemerovo, 1950)
 Kuzbass State University
 Maritime State University (Vladivostok, 1890)
 Norilsk State Industrial Institute (1961)
 Northeastern State University (Magadan, 1960)
 North-Eastern Federal University (Yakutsk, 1956)
 Novosibirsk Conservatory (1956)
 Novosibirsk Higher Military Command School (1967)
 Novosibirsk Military Institute of Internal Troops (1971)
 Novosibirsk State Agricultural University (1936)
 Novosibirsk State Medical University (1935)
 Novosibirsk State Pedagogical University (1935)
 Novosibirsk State Technical University (1950)
 Novosibirsk State University (1959)
 Novosibirsk State University of Architecture and Civil Engineering (1930)
 Novosibirsk State University of Architecture, Design and Arts (1989)
 Novosibirsk State University of Economics and Management (1929)
 Omsk State Technical University (1942)
 Omsk Academy of Law
 Omsk Medical Academy
 Omsk Road-Transport Academy
 Omsk State Transport University (1961)
 Omsk State Agrarian University (1918) (connected with Omsk State Veterinary Institute and Institute of Agribusiness and Continuing Education)
 Omsk State Pedagogical University
 Omsk State University (1974)
 Omsk University of Consumer Service Technology
 Omsk University of Physical Culture
 Pacific National University (Khabarovsk, 1958)
 Pacific State Medical University (Vladivostok, 1958)
 Primorsky State Agricultural Academy (Vladivostok, 1957)
 Seversk State Technological Academy
 Siberian Federal University (Krasnoyarsk, 2006)
 Siberian Academy of Public Service
 Siberian State Aerospace University (Russian abbreviation is SibGAU) (Krasnoyarsk, 1960)
 Siberian State Academy of Motorcars and Roads
 Siberian State Industrial University (Novokuznetsk, 1930)
 Siberian State Institute of Arts (Krasnoyarsk, 1977)
 Siberian State Technological University (Russian abbreviation is SibGTU), the oldest in the city of Krasnoyarsk, founded in 1930 as the Siberian Institute of Forest)
 Siberian State Transport University (Novosibirsk, 1932)
 Siberian State University of Communication
 Siberian State University of Geosystems and Technologies (Novosibirsk, 1933)
 Siberian State University of Telecommunications and Informatics (Novosibirsk, 1953)
 Siberian State University of Water Transport (Novosibirsk, 1951)
 Siberian University of Small Business
 South Ural State University (1943)
 Sukachev Institute of Forest (1944)
 Trans-Baikal State University (1938)
 Tuvan Institute of Humanitarian Research
 Tuvan State University (1952)
 Tyumen State Oil and Gas University
 Vladivostok State University of Economics and Service (1967)

Tomsk

 Tomsk State University (1878) (First university in Siberia)
 Siberian State Medical University (1888)
 Tomsk Polytechnic University (1896) (First technical university in Siberia)
 Tomsk State Pedagogical University (1902)
 Tomsk State University of Architecture and Building (1952)
 Tomsk State University of Control Systems and Radioelectronics (1962)
 Institute of Petroleum Geology and Geophysics Siberian Branch of RAS
 Institute of Petroleum Chemistry Siberian Branch of RAS
 Institute for Monitoring Climatic and Ecological Systems Siberian Branch of RAS
 Republican Scientific-Technical Center at ISPMS SB RAS
 Institute of Atmospheric Optics Siberian Branch of RAS
 High Current Electronics Institute Siberian Branch of RAS
 Institute of Strength Physics and Materials Science SB RAS

See also

Akademgorodok in Novosibirsk
Akademgorodok in Tomsk
Akademgorodok in Krasnoyarsk
 List of Russian scientists

References

External links
 Initiative of the UNESCO Chair from Siberia
 Siberia: Russia's Economic Heartland and Daunting Dilemma from the Brookings Institution
  Russian Education Ministry Information on Accreditation
Data on Siberian schools